Sakora Wonoo is a kente clothing weaving urban area in the Kwabre East District of Ashanti, noted for its Kente weaving alongside Bonwire and Adanwomase.

References

Populated places in the Ashanti Region